Eknath Prabhakar Ghate is a mathematician specialising in number theory and working at the School of Mathematics, Tata Institute of Fundamental Research, Mumbai, India. He was awarded the Shanti Swarup Bhatnagar Prize for science and technology, the highest science award in India, for the year 2013 in the mathematical sciences category.

Early life and education 
Ghate was schooled at Mayo College, Ajmer and at the International School Manila. He studied at St. Stephen's College, Delhi and obtained his bachelor's degree from the College of Arts & Sciences, University of Pennsylvania in 1991. He earned his Ph.D. from the University of California, Los Angeles, in 1996; his doctoral advisor was Haruzo Hida.

Career 
Ghate is a professor at the Tata Institute of Fundamental Research. In number theory, Ghate is mostly interested in problems connected to automorphic forms, Galois representations, and the special values of L-functions.

Awards 
Ghate was awarded the Bhatnagar Award in 2013. Ghate was elected a Fellow of the Indian Academy of Sciences in 2014. Ghate was awarded the JTM Gibson Award for Excellence by Mayo College in 2019. He was elected Fellow of the Indian National Science Academy in 2021.

References

External links
Eknath Ghate's Homepage

1969 births
Living people
Indian number theorists
Academic staff of Tata Institute of Fundamental Research
St. Stephen's College, Delhi alumni
University of California, Los Angeles alumni
University of Pennsylvania alumni
20th-century Indian mathematicians
Recipients of the Shanti Swarup Bhatnagar Award in Mathematical Science